Paul Ogorzow (29 September 1912 – 26 July 1941), was a German serial killer and rapist, known as The S-Bahn Murderer, convicted for the killing of eight women in Nazi-era Berlin between October 1940 and July 1941.

He was executed at Plötzensee Prison.

Background

Early life
Paul Ogorzow was born on 29 September 1912 in the village of Muntowen, East Prussia, German Empire (present-day Muntowo, Poland), the illegitimate child of Marie Saga, a farm worker. Saga's father later filled out his new grandson's birth certificate, marking it with three crosses and the child's birth name: Paul Saga. In 1924, the now 12-year-old Saga was adopted by Johann Ogorzow, a farmer in Havelland. He eventually took Ogorzow's surname as his own and relocated to Nauen, near Berlin. He initially worked as a laborer on his adoptive father's farm and later found employment with a steel foundry in Brandenburg-an-der-Havel.

Adult life
Ogorzow joined the Nazi Party in 1931, at the age of 18, and the following year became a member of its paramilitary branch, the Sturmabteilung (SA). After the Nazi seizure of power in 1933, he rose modestly in the Party ranks, and by the time of his capture held the position of Scharführer (squad leader) in the SA.

In 1934, Ogorzow was hired as a platelayer by the national railroad, Deutsche Reichsbahn, which ran the Berlin S-Bahn. He steadily worked his way up through the organization, eventually becoming an assistant signalman at Rummelsberg depot in the eastern suburbs of Berlin, close to Karlshorst. This was the area where most of his crimes later occurred.

In 1937, Ogorzow married Gertrude Ziegelmann, a saleswoman two years older than himself. They had two children, a son and a daughter. Initially, they lived with Ogorzow's mother in a working class area of Berlin with allotments, apartment blocks and tenement shacks. The family later moved to another apartment in the suburb of Karlshorst, near to where Ogorzow worked. He was often seen playing with his children, spending a lot of time in his garden and tending a small cherry orchard in the backyard. At his trial, Ziegelmann gave evidence that he often became violent and abusive, obsessively making unfounded claims of her being unfaithful to him.

Ogorzow traveled to his job at the rail service daily, either by train, on foot or by bicycle. He was generally well regarded by his railway coworkers, and was considered reliable and highly competent, often operating both the light signals and the telegraph simultaneously. Although he generally worked in and around a signal box at Zobtener Straße, where the VnK Railway meets the S-Bahn, he was often dispatched to work at various locations along the S-Bahn, always wearing his uniform.

Crimes

Early crimes
After his capture, Ogorzow extensively detailed his various criminal activities to police, allowing for a more precise reconstruction of his crimes. In late August 1939, while he and his family were residing in Karlshorst, Ogorzow embarked on a series of violent attacks, randomly sexually assaulting and raping dozens of women in and around the Friedrichsfelde district. At that time, the neighborhood was populated mostly by solitary housewives whose husbands had been called up to serve in World War II. It was these vulnerable women who initially served as Ogorzow's primary source of victims, and police documented 31 separate cases of rape and other sexual assaults that occurred in the allotments and tenement area, all of which were later connected to Ogorzow. During his attacks, he either choked his victims, threatened them with a knife, or bludgeoned them, and in their statements all the victims mentioned their attacker wore a railway worker's uniform.

Ogorzow first began attempting to murder some of his victims during this time, but his initial attempts were unsuccessful. Between August 1939 and July 1940 Ogorzow attacked and stabbed three different women, all of whom recovered and later served as witnesses against him. In August 1940, he savagely bludgeoned another woman after raping her on board the S-Bahn. She survived only because after she lost consciousness, Ogorzow mistakenly thought she had died. Another failed effort in September resulted in the victim surviving not only an attempted strangulation, but also being thrown from a moving train by Ogorzow. He soon suffered another setback when he attempted to rape another woman in an S-Bahn station, where her husband and brother-in-law, whom Ogorzow had failed to notice, rushed to her aid after she screamed for help. Ogorzow managed to escape after being severely beaten. In light of this close call, Ogorzow changed his modus operandi, and his new approach was more successful.

Murders
Ogorzow renewed his series of attacks in October 1940, focusing primarily on the 9-kilometre stretch of the S-Bahn between the Rummelsburg train yard and station and Friedrichshagen station. Wearing his work uniform, Ogorzow lurked aboard empty carriages waiting for potential victims as the train's passenger cars were not illuminated at the time because of the wartime blackout of Berlin. He relied heavily on the fact that lone female passengers were not suspicious of a uniformed employee of the S-Bahn approaching them, apparently to ask for their ticket. Once the women were distracted, Ogorzow attacked, strangling or striking the victim in the head with a 2-inch-thick piece of lead-encased telephone cable.

He committed his first murder on 4 October 1940, going on the pretext of a tryst to the home of 20-year-old mother-of-two Gertrude "Gerda" Ditter, whose husband, Arthur, was away in the military, and stabbing her to death. Two months later, on the evening of 4 December, he killed two more women: he crushed the skull of S-Bahn passenger Elfriede Franke with an iron bar before hurling her corpse from the moving train, and less than an hour later, met 19-year-old Irmgard Freese on the street as she was walking home and raped her before also bludgeoning her to death. On 22 December, railroad workers discovered the body of a fourth victim, Elisabeth Bungener, discarded alongside the railroad tracks. A medical examination determined she had died as the result of a fractured skull.

Six days later, on 28 December 1940, the police recovered Gertrude Siewert the morning after she had been assaulted and thrown from the train by Ogorzow. Suffering from exposure and various life-threatening traumas, Siewert was rushed to the hospital, where she eventually died from her injuries the following day. This scene repeated itself on 5 January 1941, when the unconscious body of Hedwig Ebauer, who was five months pregnant, was located near the S-Bahn. Ogorzow had unsuccessfully attempted to strangle Ebauer before throwing her from the train alive, and like Siewert, Ebauer succumbed to her injuries later that day in the hospital, never regaining consciousness.

On 11 February, the remains of Ogorzow's seventh victim, Johanna Voigt, a pregnant mother of three, were found. An autopsy later confirmed what most suspected, that Voigt had died as the result of repeated blows to the head and injuries sustained after being thrown from the train. Given the obvious similarities in the various crimes, all seven deaths were deemed to be the work of the same individual.

Investigation
Two of Ogorzow's previous victims, who had survived being raped and thrown from the S-Bahn, were able to describe the attack and murder attempt, both confirming to police that their assailant was a railway employee in a black uniform. By December 1940, as other similar crimes were already being reported, the police began looking for a suspect matching Ogorzow's description. However, all domestic news coverage at this time was either controlled or else heavily censored by various agencies within the Nazi government. This was especially true of news items such as the S-Bahn murders, which might damage the war-time morale of the German people. The Ministry of Public Enlightenment and Propaganda under Joseph Goebbels, the Nazi Party's primary censorship authority, even issued a directive to German journalists regarding limits to be placed on coverage of the S-Bahn murders.

The homicide unit of the Berlin Police, under SS-Hauptsturmfuhrer Wilhelm Lüdtke, was not able to publicly seek information about the rapes or murders or to warn the population about travelling by rail at night. Instead, Lüdtke sent out his best detectives to discreetly deal with the case. The police operation was underway by December 1940, with 5,000 of Berlin's 8,000 railway workers being interviewed, and police patrols were doubled on the S-Bahn section. The Nazi Party dispatched functionaries to personally protect unaccompanied women who commuted through the area. Police officers disguised as females and female detectives were used as bait aboard second-class carriages in an attempt to catch the killer. Other detectives were disguised as railway workers, and commuters were watched at each station. Ogorzow volunteered for a job escorting solitary women during the night hours.

Despite this effort, the Kriminalpolizei did not catch more than a handful of petty criminals unrelated to the case. However, the increased police attention did prompt Ogorzow to become cautiously inactive for nearly five months following his murder of Voigt in February 1941. He did not re-emerge until 3 July 1941, when he claimed his eighth and final victim, 35-year-old Frieda Koziol. She was raped and then bludgeoned to death in the same Friedrichsfelde area where Ogorzow had begun his wave of sex crimes two years before.

Arrest and conviction
Ogorzow, who often made misogynistic comments to co-workers and talked often of his fascination with killing, was eventually singled out by investigators looking for potential suspects among railroad employees following the murder of Koziol. A co-worker reported to police that Ogorzow often climbed over the fence of the railway depot during work hours. Ogorzow's explanation was that he sneaked out to meet a mistress whose husband was in the military. 

Wilhelm Lüdtke personally inspected Ogorzow's railway uniforms, all of which had numerous blood stains, and Ogorzow was arrested by the Kriminalpolizei on 12 July 1941. In an intimidating interrogation in a small room under the light of a single light bulb, Ogorzow was confronted with one of his severely injured victims and a tray of skulls from several of his other victims. Ogorzow willingly confessed his crimes to Lüdtke, but blamed his murder spree on alcoholism and claimed that a Jewish doctor had treated him incompetently for gonorrhea. Ogorzow was formally expelled from the Nazi Party just days prior to his indictment for murder.

Ogorzow eventually pleaded guilty to eight murders, six attempted murders and thirty-one cases of assault, which included the rapes. He was promptly sentenced to death on 24 July by the Berlin Kammergericht (regional superior court), in the presence of eight witnesses. The final charges against him were of criminal violence. Ogorzow was subsequently declared an enemy of the people by the Nazi regime, and executed by guillotine at Plötzensee Prison on 26 July 1941, two days after his sentencing.

After the war, one of the officers who was heavily involved in the Ogorzow investigation, Georg Heuser, was charged by a West German court for his role in an Einsatzgruppen squad. He was found guilty of being an accessory to over 11,000 murders and sentenced to 15 years in prison. Heuser only served 6 years of his sentence before being released, and died in 1989.

Impact of World War II and Nazi society

War-time conditions
Historian Roger Moorhouse has suggested that the Kriminalpolizei were hampered in their investigation of the murders by several concurrent obstacles. Firstly, the Nazi government had instituted a rigorous program of wartime media censorship in order not to spread panic and demoralise civilians on the home front. These restrictions meant that there were only cursory details released about each case, which impeded the progress of the investigation. Secondly, due to ongoing Allied bombing raids on the German capital, blackout conditions were necessary to shield strategically important targets from airborne destruction. As a side effect, however, these conditions were conducive to criminal activity. Ogorzow himself exploited the blackouts, using them to stalk and kill his victims and then to escape from possible surveillance under the cover of darkness.

S-Bahn operations
The Berlin S-Bahn appears to have had a poor health and safety record at the time, which meant that the  had to contend with a surplus of corpses resulting both from accidental deaths on the rail line and those killed during Allied bombing raids. This resulted in a large forensic backlog that placed the police force and municipal medical services at a further disadvantage.

Nazi doctrine
The official Nazi ideology, whose tenets included anti-Semitism, xenophobia and notions of German racial superiority, discouraged investigators from considering the possibility that someone "racially German" (or Aryan) could be responsible for such heinous crimes. Much initial suspicion wrongly settled on foreign forced laborers (mostly Polish prisoners of war) working in the numerous factories adjacent to the rail network. Local Jews were also targeted unjustly for investigation in connection with the murders, albeit mainly for ideological reasons.

See also
Gordon Cummins
Bruno Lüdke
1941 in Germany
List of German serial killers

References

Sources
Roger Moorhouse: "Nazi Serial Killer" BBC History: 10: 5: May 2009: 38–40.
Berlin at War: Life and Death in Hitler's Capital, 1939-1945, Roger Moorhouse, [2010], Vintage (2011); 
Historian at Large : Blog
A Serial Killer in Nazi Berlin: The Chilling True Story of the S-Bahn Murderer, Scott Andrew Selby, Berkley Publishing Group (2014); 

1912 births
1941 deaths
Executed German serial killers
People convicted of murder by Germany
German people executed by Nazi Germany
German people convicted of rape
Male serial killers
Nazis executed by Nazi Germany
Nazis executed by guillotine
People executed by guillotine at Plötzensee Prison
People from East Prussia
People from Mrągowo
Sturmabteilung personnel
Violence against women in Germany